U.S. Route 95 (US 95) is a United States Numbered Highway, stretching from the Mexican border in San Luis, Arizona to the Canadian border near Eastport, Idaho. The California portion of US 95 traverses through the far eastern edges of both Riverside and San Bernardino counties.  US 95 serves Blythe and Needles and junctions with SR 62 at Vidal Junction.

The route overlaps with two Interstate highways, specifically I-10 near Blythe and I-40 near Needles.

Route description

US 95, running concurrently with I-10, crosses the Colorado River from the state of Arizona and enters the city of Blythe. The highway exits I-10 at Intake Boulevard and turns due north, leaving the city limits. A few miles north, US 95 turns northeast to parallel the Colorado River. The route passes through the Big Maria Mountains and the Riverside Mountains before entering San Bernardino County.

Upon entering San Bernardino County, US 95 turns away from the Colorado River, heading northwest towards Vidal Junction, the junction with SR 62 in the Vidal Valley. The highway continues north through the Chemehuevi Valley and the Chemehuevi Mountains before entering the city of Needles after several miles. After passing the Needles Municipal Airport, US 95 merges onto I-40 westbound and continues through Needles on the freeway. US 95 exits from I-40 west of Needles and continues northwest to Searchlight Junction, where US 95 continues north at the junction with the old routing of US 66. The highway continues north, east of Homer Mountain, to the Nevada state line.

US 95 is part of the California Freeway and Expressway System, and a small portion near I-10 and the portion north of I-40 are part of the National Highway System, a network of highways that are considered essential to the country's economy, defense, and mobility by the Federal Highway Administration. US 95 is eligible for the State Scenic Highway System, but it is not officially designated as a scenic highway by the California Department of Transportation.

History
Route 146 was designated by the California State Legislature in 1933 and contained the portion from Blythe to the Nevada state line. US 95 was extended south from its routing in Idaho by AASHO through Searchlight and Needles to Blythe on June 28, 1939; the routing became effective at the start of 1940. In the 1964 state highway renumbering, the law was changed to reflect the designation as US 95.

Major intersections

See also

References

External links

California @ AARoads.com - U.S. Route 95
Caltrans: Route 95 highway conditions
California Highways: US 95

 California
95
Roads in Riverside County, California
Roads in San Bernardino County, California
Colorado River